Sweden is scheduled to compete at the 2019 European Games, in Minsk, Belarus from 21 to 30 June 2019. The Swedish Olympic Committee has selected 51 athletes to compete at the games.

Medalists

Archery

Badminton

Boxing

Canoe sprint

Men

Women

Gymnastics

Artistic
Women

Trampoline

Judo

Karate

Shooting

Men

Women

Mixed team

Table tennis

Wrestling

Men's Greco-Roman

Women's freestyle

References

Nations at the 2019 European Games
European Games
2019